Offizierstellvertreter Reinhard Treptow (born 28 November 1892, date of death unknown) was a World War I flying ace credited with six aerial victories.

Biography
Reinhard Treptow was born in Leikow on 28 November 1892. He joined the German Army's 2nd Field Artillery Regiment on 13 October 1913, before World War I began.

He reported for aviation training in 1915, and was posted to Fliegerersatz-Abteilung  (Replacement Detachment) 5 in Hannover, Germany. Training completed, he passed on to Flieger-Abteilung (Artillerie) Flier Detachment (Artillery) 207 on 25 October 1915. He flew artillery direction and reconnaissance missions there until March 1917. He was then transferred to a fighter squadron, Jagdstaffel 25, which was stationed in Macedonia.

References

Written sources
 Franks, Norman; Bailey, Frank W.; Guest, Russell. Above the Lines: The Aces and Fighter Units of the German Air Service, Naval Air Service and Flanders Marine Corps, 1914–1918. Grub Street, 1993. , .

1892 births
Year of death missing
German World War I flying aces